Evelyn L. Hu is the Tarr-Coyne Professor of Applied Physics and of Electrical Engineering at Harvard University. Hu has made major contributions to nanotechnology by designing and creating complex nanostructures. Her work has focused on nanoscale devices made from compound semiconductors and on novel devices made by integrating various materials, both organic and inorganic. She has also created nanophotonic structures that might someday facilitate quantum computing.

Early life and education
Hu's parents emigrated to the United States from China in 1944–1945. She was born in New York City. An alumna of Hunter College High School, she received her B.A. from Barnard College in 1969, and her M.A. and Ph.D. from Columbia University, all in physics, in 1971 and 1975, respectively. Hu's PhD advisor was nuclear physicist Chien-Shiung Wu.

Career and research
Hu was employed at AT&T's Bell Laboratories from 1975 to 1984, when she joined University of California, Santa Barbara (UCSB) as a full professor, a position she has held since 1984. She served UCSB's Department of Electrical and Computer Engineering as vice chair from 1989 to 1992 and as chair from 1992 to 1994. 
In 2008, Hu was elected to the United States National Academy of Sciences.  She has been a pioneer in the fabrication of nanoscale electronic and photonic devices, and was named Gordon McKay Professor of Applied Physics and Electrical Engineering in Harvard University's School of Engineering and Applied Sciences (SEAS), effective January 1, 2009. She has also served since 2000 as scientific co-director of the California NanoSystems Institute, a joint initiative at UCSB and the University of California, Los Angeles.

Hu's influential work in nanofabrication has included high-resolution patterning and high-resolution etching of circuits onto nanoscale materials. She has also developed biological approaches to nanotechnology, using biological assembly pathways to control the composition and structure of novel devices. Some of her research ideas led to her co-founding of Cambridge, Massachusetts-based Cambrios Technology, a start-up that is developing new, cost-effective materials of importance for electronic device applications. At UCSB, she has led the Institute for Quantum Engineering, Science and Technology, the National Science Foundation-funded Center for Quantized Electronic Structures and Center for Robotic Systems in Microelectronics, and the UCSB component of the National Science Foundation's National Nanofabrication Users Network.

According to a winter (November) 2012 online news story article released by the Harvard School of Engineering and Applied Sciences (featured on the Harvard University web site's home page), Hu is exploring the use of gallium nitride wafers at the nano-scale level in the formation and use of quantum dots in nanophotonics (the study of and manipulation of light via materials- photonics- at the nano-scale level), which could eventually find use in smartphone screens and the (less-risky, non-invasive) fluorescent tagging of biological cells for their study in health and disease. Hu is a reviewing editor at the journal Science.

Awards
 1994, Fellow, Institute of Electrical and Electronics Engineers (IEEE)
 1995, Fellow, American Physical Society
 1998, Fellow, American Association for the Advancement of Science
 2002, elected to the National Academy of Engineering 
 2008, elected to the National Academy of Sciences
 2013, Honorary Doctorate from Heriot-Watt University 
 2019, IEEE Andrew Grove Technical Field Award. 
 ETH Day 2019, Hu was awarded the only honorary doctorate degree of the year from the ETH in Zurich.
 2021, IEEE/RSE James Clerk Maxwell Medal

References

External links
Hu Group Website
Evelyn Hu named professor of applied physics, electrical engineering in SEAS
Evelyn Hu's Page at Harvard University SEAS Website

Living people
American women physicists
American materials scientists
Fellow Members of the IEEE
Fellows of the American Association for the Advancement of Science
Members of the United States National Academy of Sciences
Members of the United States National Academy of Engineering
Scientists at Bell Labs
Columbia Graduate School of Arts and Sciences alumni
Barnard College alumni
Harvard University faculty
University of California, Santa Barbara faculty
American women engineers
American people of Chinese descent
21st-century women engineers
1947 births
Women in optics
American women academics
21st-century American women